Glenea pseudogiraffa is a species of beetle in the family Cerambycidae. It was described by Báguena and Stephan von Breuning in 1958.

Subspecies
 Glenea pseudogiraffa pseudogiraffa Báguena & Breuning, 1958
 Glenea pseudogiraffa taverniersi Breuning, 1974

References

pseudogiraffa
Beetles described in 1958